This is a list of town tramway systems in Russia by federal district.  It includes all tram systems, past and present. Cities with currently operating systems are indicated in bold. The use of the diamond (♦) symbol indicates where there were (or are) two or more independent tram systems operating concurrently within a single metropolitan area. Those tram systems that operated on other than standard-gauge railway track (where known) are indicated in the 'Notes' column.

Central Federal District

Far Eastern Federal District

Siberian Federal District

Northwestern Federal District

Southern Federal District

Ural Federal District

Volga Federal District

See also
 List of town tramway systems in Europe
 List of trolleybus systems in Russia
 List of tram and light rail transit systems
 List of metro systems

References

Bibliography
 Books, Periodicals and External Links

External links
 World Tram and Trolleybus Systems

Tramways
Russia